The Holdridge life zones system is a global bioclimatic scheme for the classification of land areas. It was first published by Leslie Holdridge in 1947, and updated in 1967. It is a relatively simple system based on few empirical data, giving objective criteria. A basic assumption of the system is that both soil and the climax vegetation can be mapped once the climate is known.

Scheme
While it was first designed for tropical and subtropical areas, the system now applies globally. The system has been shown to fit not just tropical vegetation zones,but Mediterranean zones, and boreal zones too, but is less applicable to cold oceanic or cold arid climates where moisture becomes the predominant factor. The system has found a major use in assessing the potential changes in natural vegetation patterns due to global warming.

The three major axes of the barycentric subdivisions are:
 precipitation (annual, logarithmic)
 biotemperature (mean annual, logarithmic)
 potential evapotranspiration ratio  (PET) to mean total annual precipitation.

Further indicators incorporated into the system are:
 humidity provinces
 latitudinal regions
 altitudinal belts

Biotemperature is based on the growing season length and temperature. It is measured as the mean of all annual temperatures, with all temperatures below freezing and above 30 °C adjusted to 0 °C, as most plants are dormant at these temperatures. Holdridge's system uses biotemperature first, rather than the temperate latitude bias of Merriam's life zones, and does not primarily consider elevation directly. The system is considered more appropriate for tropical vegetation than Merriam's system.

Scientific relationship between the 3 axes and 3 indicators 
Potential evapotranspiration (PET) is the amount of water that would be evaporated and transpired if there were enough water available. Higher temperatures result in higher PET. Evapotranspiration (ET) is the raw sum of evaporation and plant transpiration from the Earth's land surface to atmosphere. Evapotranspiration can never be greater than PET. The ratio, Precipitation/PET, is the aridity index (AI), with an AI<0.2 indicating arid/hyperarid, and AI<0.5 indicating dry.
         Coldest
           /\
          /  \
     PET - -- - Rain
The coldest regions have not much evapotranspiration nor precipitation as there is not enough heat to evaporate much water, hence polar deserts. In the warmer regions, there are deserts with maximum PET but low rainfall that make the soil even drier, and rain forests with low PET and maximum rainfall causing river systems to drain excess water into oceans.

Classes 
All the classes defined within the system, as used by the International Institute for Applied Systems Analysis (IIASA), are:

 Polar desert
 Subpolar dry tundra
 Subpolar moist tundra
 Subpolar wet tundra
 Subpolar rain tundra
 Boreal desert
 Boreal dry scrub
 Boreal moist forest
 Boreal wet forest
 Boreal rain forest
 Cool temperate desert
 Cool temperate desert scrub
 Cool temperate steppe
 Cool temperate moist forest
 Cool temperate wet forest
 Cool temperate rain forest
 Warm temperate desert
 Warm temperate desert scrub
 Warm temperate thorn scrub
 Warm temperate dry forest
 Warm temperate moist forest
 Warm temperate wet forest
 Warm temperate rain forest
 Subtropical desert
 Subtropical desert scrub
 Subtropical thorn woodland
 Subtropical dry forest
 Subtropical moist forest
 Subtropical wet forest
 Subtropical rain forest
 Tropical desert
 Tropical desert scrub
 Tropical thorn woodland
 Tropical very dry forest
 Tropical dry forest
 Tropical moist forest
 Tropical wet forest
 Tropical rain forest

See also
Andrew Delmar Hopkins
Biome
Ecoregion
Holdridge life zones in Guatemala
Köppen climate classification
Life zone
Trewartha climate classification

References 

Biogeographic realms
Sustainable building
Geographic classifications
Climate and weather classification systems